Adalbert of Magdeburg (c. 91020 June 981), sometimes incorrectly shortened to "Albert", known as the Apostle of the Slavs, was the first Archbishop of Magdeburg (from 968) and a successful missionary to the Polabian Slavs to the east of what is contemporarily Germany. He was later canonised and his liturgical feast day was assigned as 20 June.

Life
Adalbert was born c. 910, possibly in Alsace or Lorraine, France. He was a German monk at the Benedictine Monastery of St. Maximinus in Trier, Germany. He was consecrated a Roman Catholic bishop and in 961 was sent to Kievan Rus. Princess Olga of Kiev had asked Emperor Otto I (the Great) to provide her a missionary from the Roman Catholic Church. Her son took the crown from her in 961, just as Adalbert arrived in Kievan Rus. Adalbert's missionary companions were slain and Adalbert barely escaped. Kievan Rus subsequently was converted by missionaries from Constantinople and became part of Byzantine Christianity.

Upon escaping Kievan Rus, Adalbert traveled to the imperial court at Mainz, Germany, where he remained for four years, until he was named Abbot of Wissembourg in Alsace. There he worked to improve the education of the monks. He later became the first Archbishop of Magdeburg, Saxony-Anhalt, in contemporary Germany. Adalbert travelled to Rome to receive the pallium before assuming his see.

The Archiepiscopacies of Hamburg and Bremen had been established with the intention that they would serve as bases for missions in northern and eastern Europe. The Archdiocese of Magdeburg was designated to provide missionaries to the eastern European Slavs. Adalbert also established dioceses for Naumburg; Meissen; Merseburg; Brandenburg; Havelberg; and Poznań, Poland. He died on 20 June 981 in Zscherben (contemporarily in (former) Geusa, in Merseburg, Saxony-Anhalt, Germany).

A student of Adalbert for some years named Vojtěch Slavníkovec, who at his Confirmation took the very name of his tutor, went on from Adalbert's tutelage to successfully evangelize many Slavic peoples, receive the crown of martyrdom in Prussia, and was canonized as St. Adalbert of Prague.

Saint Adalbert's Cemetery in Milwaukee, Wisconsin, is dedicated to the archbishop of Magdeburg.

References

Further reading

External links
Catholic Online: Saints & Angels: St. Adalbert of Magdeburg
HighBeam Research: Adalbert of Magdeburg

|-

Medieval German saints
Archbishops of Magdeburg
10th-century archbishops
910s births
981 deaths
Year of birth unknown
German Benedictines
10th-century Christian saints
Benedictine bishops
Alsatian saints
10th-century Latin writers
10th-century German writers
10th-century German historians